William Hulle (fl. 1399) of Salisbury, Wiltshire, was an English politician.

He was a Member (MP) of the Parliament of England for Salisbury in 1399.

References

14th-century births
Year of death missing
English MPs 1399
People from Salisbury